This is a list of some of the breeds of horse considered in Germany to be wholly or partly of German origin. In 2014 there were 151 horse breeds reported to DAD-IS by Germany, many of them imported from other parts of the world. Only those breeds with some history of development within present-day Germany are listed below. Inclusion here does not necessarily imply that a breed is predominantly or exclusively German.

References

 
Horse